The dwarf sturgeon, little shovelnose sturgeon, or small Amu-Darya shovelnose sturgeon (Pseudoscaphirhynchus hermanni) is a species of fish in the family Acipenseridae. It is found in Turkmenistan, Uzbekistan and probably in Tajikistan.

Population
The Pseudoscaphirhynchus hermanni population is recorded to be a rare species. There are few recordings of this species being caught, but there are accusations that fishermen are unknowingly catching them. The population trend of this species is decreasing. The Pseudoscaphirhynchus hermanni is being negatively affected due to dams, poaching, water extraction, irrigation, and high levels of water pollution including mineral fertilizers, pesticides for cotton agriculture, and drainage waste. More survey work on this species is needed to determine the status of their population. Overall this species is recorded to be a critically endangered species.

Diet
The Pseudoscaphirhynchus hermanni has a diet of small aquatic invertebrates.

Distribution
Pseudoscaphirhynchus hermanni is endemic to the Amu Darya river basin in Turkmenistan and Uzbekistan, and might also occur in Tajikistan. It formerly occurred up to the Aral Sea.

Identification
The Pseudoscaphirhynchus hermanni has been recorded reaching a maximum length of 27 centimeters or 10.63 inches. The maximum reported weight of this species is 51 grams or 0.11 pounds. The oldest reported age of this species is six years old. This species is considered to be potamodromous. This species is also recorded to be sensitive to chemicals in the water. One of the specific features of Pseudoscaphirhynchus hermanni is the crease on the external edge of pectoral fin.

Environment
The Pseudoscaphirhynchus hermanni is recorded to live in freshwater or slightly salty environments within a demersal depth range. This species lives in a temperate climate.

Common names
The common names of the Pseudoscaphirhynchus hermanni in various languages include the following:
Dwarf Sturgeon : English
Little Shovelnose Sturgeon : English
Little Amu-Darya Shovelnose : English
Lopatonos hermannův : Czech (česky)
Nibylopstons amu-daryjski : Polish (polski)
Pikkulapiosampi : Finnish (suomen kieli)
Амударьинский малый лопатонос : Russian (русский язык)
Лжелопатонос амударьинский малый : Russian (русский язык)
短尾拟铲鲟 : Mandarin Chinese
短尾擬鏟鱘 : Mandarin Chinese
난쟁이철갑상어 : Korean

References

Sources

External links
 Pseudoscaphirhynchus hermanni at FishBase
 Pseudoscaphirhynchus hermanni  - photos at FishBase: http://www.fishbase.us/photos/ThumbnailsSummary.php?ID=8764
 Video of Pseudoscaphirhynchus hermanni and the both forms of Pseudoscaphirhynchus kaufmanni in one pool for comparison (in Pseudoscaphirhynchus hermanni the crease on the external edge of pectoral fin is well seen) - the lower stream of Amu Darya River (Khorezm Province, Uzbekistan):https://www.youtube.com/watch?v=lio_vxQ7yG8&t=2s
 Pseudoscaphirhynchus of Amu Darya River including Pseudoscaphirhynchus hermanni in the lower stream of Amu Darya (Uzbekistan) with photos and videos of the fish: http://life-on-earth.ru/amu-darya-and-syr-darya-shovelnose-sturgeons/amu-darya-shovelnose-sturgeons-conservation-uzbekistan
 Pseudoscaphirhynchus of Amu Darya River including Pseudoscaphirhynchus hermanni in the middle straem of Amu Darya (Turkmenistan) with photos of the fish: http://life-on-earth.ru/sokhranenie-bioraznoobraziya/amudarinskie-lopatonosy-turkmenistan
 L. S. Berg, Freshwater Fishes of the USSR and the neighboring countries, Part I, the 4th Edition, Zoological Institute of Academy of Sciences of the USSR, Publishing House of Academy of Sciences of the USSR, Moscow-Leningrad 1948 - basic data on Pseudoscaphirhynchus hermanni (pages 105 and 108) and  picture of the crease on the external edge of pectoral fin (page 109): http://life-on-earth.ru/images/Plesheevo1/Berg_Fishes_of_the_USSR_Part1.PDF
 V.B. Sal'nikov, Ichtyofauna of Amu Darya River in Turkmenistan: The Updated List and Native Species Populations Status, Article, 2012, published by life-on-earth.ru website in 2016: http://life-on-earth.ru/images/Lopatonosy-Turkmenistan/Salnikov_Ichtiofauna_of_Amudarya_River.pdf

Pseudoscaphirhynchus
Freshwater fish of Asia
Fish of Central Asia
Fauna of Tajikistan
Critically endangered fish
Critically endangered fauna of Asia
Taxonomy articles created by Polbot
Fish described in 1877